Al-Hamamiyat  is a Syrian village located in the Kafr Zita Subdistrict of the Mahardah District in Hama Governorate. According to the Syria Central Bureau of Statistics (CBS), al-Hamamiyat had a population of 1,305 in the 2004 census. It is situated at 255 metres above sea level.

References 

Populated places in Mahardah District